The Japan Sevens, also known as the Tokyo Sevens, is an annual rugby sevens tournament held at the Chichibunomiya Rugby Stadium in Tokyo, Japan. It was a part of the Sevens World Series from 2000 to 2001 and from 2012 to 2015.

History

The first Tokyo Sevens was held in 1993, with a number of Japan's top university teams and company teams competing. Meiji University won the cup in the first year, and Suntory the following year, 1994.

In 1995, the international tournament was added.

The international tournament was incorporated into IRB Sevens World Series as the Tokyo International Sevens in 2000 and 2001. A further cup win each to Fiji and New Zealand, respectively, was recorded in those two years. The Tokyo Sevens was then effectively replaced by the Singapore Sevens on the world circuit for the 2002 season.

A decade passed before Tokyo was included in the World Sevens Series again, hosting four events from 2012 to 2015. A preparatory international sevens tournament had been planned for Tokyo in 2011 but this had to be cancelled due to the earthquake and tsunami aftermath that year.

Results

Key:Blue border on the left indicates tournaments included in the World Rugby Sevens Series.

See also
 Japan Women's Sevens

References

External links

     
Former World Rugby Sevens Series tournaments
International rugby union competitions hosted by Japan
Recurring sporting events established in 1995
Recurring sporting events disestablished in 2015
1995 establishments in Japan